Kayla, or Kayliñña (Ge'ez: ካይላ kāylā, for the people, Ge'ez: ካይልኛ kāylññā, Kayla, Amharic, and Tigrinya for the language) is one of two Agaw dialects formerly spoken by a subgroup of the Beta Israel (Ethiopian Jews). It is a dialect of Qimant. The name Kayla is sometimes also used as a cover term for both Beta Israel dialects.  It is known only from unpublished notes by Jacques Faitlovitch written in the Ge'ez alphabet, recently studied by David Appleyard. It is preserved by the Beta Israel today.

See also
Qwara dialect

Bibliography
 
 David Appleyard, "Preparing a Comparative Agaw Dictionary", in ed. Griefenow-Mewis & Voigt, Cushitic & Omotic Languages: Proceedings of the 3rd International Symposium Berlin, Mar. 17-19, 1994, Rüdiger Köppe Verlag, Köln 1996.  .

References

Jewish languages
Jews and Judaism in Ethiopia
Languages of Ethiopia